The 2001–02 Macedonian First League was the 10th season of the Macedonian First Football League, the highest football league of Macedonia. The first matches of the season were played on 12 August 2001 and the last on 29 May 2002. Sloga Jugomagnat were the defending champions, having won their third title in a row. The 2001-02 champions were Vardar who had won their fourth title, first since 1995. That was the first season in which the league consisted of 12 teams and only season (until the 2014–15 season) which contained the league play-off/play-out system.

Promotion and relegation

Participating teams

Regular season
The first 22 Rounds comprise the first phase of the season, also called the Regular season. In the first phase, every team plays against every other team twice on a home-away basis. The table standings at the end of the Regular season determine the group in which each team is going to play in the Play-offs.

League table

Results

Second phase
The second phase are the so called Play-off Rounds which is divided in two groups: Championship and Relegation. The top 6 ranked teams on the table after the Regular Season qualify for the Championship group, while the bottom 6 advance to the Relegation group. The teams will keep only the head-to-head records with the teams which he entered.

Championship group

Table

Results

Relegation group

Table

Results

Top goalscorers

See also
2001–02 Macedonian Football Cup
2001–02 Macedonian Second Football League

External links
Macedonia - List of final tables (RSSSF)
Football Federation of Macedonia

Macedonia
1
Macedonian First Football League seasons